Dieter Meschede (born 17 April 1954) is a German physicist and lightweight rower.

Meschede was born in 1954 in Lathen in the Emsland district.

Meschede won a gold medal at the 1976 World Rowing Championships in Villach with the lightweight men's eight.

He teaches quantum technology at the University of Bonn. He is the president of the Deutsche Physikalische Gesellschaft and will hold this position from April 2018 for a two-year period.

Since the 21st edition (published in 2002), Meschede has been the editor of the German physics textbook .

References

German male rowers
World Rowing Championships medalists for West Germany
1954 births
Academic staff of the University of Bonn
20th-century German physicists
21st-century German physicists
Physics educators
Living people
Presidents of the German Physical Society